, there are 85 known disc golf courses in Ontario on the official PDGA Course Directory. Of these, 52 are full-size courses with 18 holes or more and 33 have fewer than 18 holes.

See also 
List of disc golf courses in Canada

Notes

References 

 
Ontario
Disc golf courses
Disc golf courses, Ontario